Sergei Markin is a Russian masculine name and surname; it may refer to:

 Sergei Ivanovich Markin (1903–1942), Russian and Soviet artist from Moscow
 Sergei Vladimirovich Markin (born 1966), Russian football coach and a former player